Bryce Baringer (born April 26, 1999) is an American football punter for the Michigan State Spartans.

Early life and high school
Baringer grew up Waterford, Michigan and attended Notre Dame Preparatory School and Marist Academy. He initially signed a National Letter of Intent to play college football at Southern Illinois, but was granted a release and committed to play at Illinois as a preferred walk-on.

College career
Baringer began his college career at Illinois, where he redshirted his true freshman season. After the season, he transferred to Michigan State University.

Baringer enrolled at Michigan State and originally did not plan on continuing his football career until he was contacted by the Spartans coaching staff. He took part in two tryouts, but was not offered a spot on the roster after either one. Baringer eventually joined the team after punters Jake Hartbarger and Tyler Hunt both suffered injuries during the 2018 season. He played in four games and punted 15 times for an average of 32.4 yards. Baringer was cut by the Spartans entering the 2019 season after the team added Australian punter Jack Bouwmeester to their recruiting class. He continued to practice punting independently and was offered to rejoin the team after Bouwmeester left the team at the conclusion of the season. Baringer entered his redshirt junior season competing with Mitchell Crawford, a graduate transfer from UTEP, but ultimately won the punting job early in the season and averaged 43.6 yards per punt on 37 punts. As a redshirt senior, he punted 59 times for a Michigan State record 48.4 yard average and was named second team All-Big Ten Conference. Baringer used the extra year of eligibility granted to college athletes in 2020 due to the COVID-19 pandemic and returned to Michigan State for a sixth year. He entered his final season ranked as the best punting prospect for the 2023 NFL Draft by ESPN analyst Mel Kiper.

Personal life
Baringer is a close friend of professional golfer James Piot, who was also his roommate at Michigan State.

References

External links
Illinois Fighting Illini bio
Michigan State Spartans bio

1999 births
Living people
All-American college football players
American football punters
Illinois Fighting Illini football players
Michigan State Spartans football players
People from Waterford, Michigan
Players of American football from Michigan